Mordellistena angolensis is a species of beetle in the family Mordellidae. It is in the genus Mordellistena. It was discovered in 1937.

References

angolensis
Beetles described in 1937